Illusion Suite is a progressive metal-band from Oslo, Norway. The band was established in 2003 and in 2009, their debut album Final Hour was released. The album was mixed and mastered at Basement Studios in Germany. They performed at ProgPower USA 2010 in Atlanta, USA.

Discography 
2004: Demo One (4-track demo) 	
2005: The Adventures of Arcan (5-track EP) 
2009: Final Hour (Limb Music/Tuba Records)
2013: The Iron Cemetery (POWER PROG)

Members
Bill Makatowicz - vocals
Kim Jacobsen - guitars
Roger Bjørge - drums
Dag Erik Johnsen - bass guitar

Former members
Øyvind Larsen - guitar
Ketil Ronold - keyboards

References

External links 

Musical groups established in 2003
2003 establishments in Norway
Norwegian progressive metal musical groups
Musical groups from Oslo